was a town located in Iwate District, Iwate Prefecture, Japan.

The villages of Tairadate, Ōbuke, Dendō and Terada were created on April 1, 1889 within Kita-Iwate District with the establishment of the municipality system. Kita-Iwate and Minami-Iwate Districts merged to form Iwate District on March 29, 1898. The four villages merged on September 30, 1956 to create the village of Nishine, which was elevated to town status on November 1, 1961. On September 1, 2005, Nishine, along with the town of Ashiro, and the village of Matsuo (all from Iwate District), was merged to create the city of Hachimantai and no longer exists as an independent municipality.

As of September 2005, the town had an estimated population of 18,442 and a population density of 110.3 persons per km². The total area was 167.16 km².

External links
 Official website of Hachimantai 

Dissolved municipalities of Iwate Prefecture
Hachimantai, Iwate